Tamara Klink may refer to:
 Tamara Klink (chess player)
 Tamara Klink (sailor)